Events from the year 1822 in Sweden

Incumbents
 Monarch – Charles XIV John

Events

 Motala Verkstad is founded by Baltzar von Platen.
 The piracy trial of Johanna Hård.
 Inauguration of the National Portrait Gallery (Sweden).
 Amorina by Carl Jonas Love Almqvist.

Births

 14 February 1822 – Betty Boije, concert contralto and composer (died 1854) 
 13 February – Betty Linderoth, watchmaker  (died 1900) 
 3 April – Elma Ström, Swedish opera singer (died 1889) 
 22 April – Bengt Nordenberg, painter  (died 1902)

Deaths

 13 March – Nils Lorens Sjöberg, poet  (born 1754)
 16 March – Gustav Badin
 Maria Nilsdotter i Ölmeskog, farmer and heroine  (born 1756)

References

 
Years of the 19th century in Sweden
Sweden